Shotwick is a small village and former civil parish, now in the parish of Puddington, on the southern end of the Wirral Peninsula in the unitary authority of Cheshire West and Chester and the ceremonial county of Cheshire, England. The village is close to the county of Flintshire on the England–Wales border. The village was located on the River Dee until it was canalised in 1736 after which the reclaimed land has since developed into the neighbouring Deeside Industrial Park. The civil parish was abolished in 2015 and merged into Puddington.

History
Shotwick is recorded in the Domesday book (1086), within the Cheshire Hundred of Willaston, with six households listed. Shotwick Castle was built about 1093 by Hugh Lupus, 1st Earl of Chester, at what is now Shotwick Park and near the River Dee, before the area succumbed to the effects of silting. The Norman castle lay in ruins by the 17th century and now only the foundations remain.
Henry II left from Shotwick for Ireland and Edward I used the port to leave for Wales in 1278.

The village, including part of the hamlet of Two Mills was within the Wirral Hundred, with a population of 95 in 1801, 100 in 1851, 82 in 1901 and 70 in 1951. It currently has a population of 120.

Gallery

See also

Listed buildings in Shotwick
St Michael's Church, Shotwick
Shotwick Hall

References

External links

Villages in Cheshire
Former civil parishes in Cheshire
Cheshire West and Chester